Jasper High School is a public high school located in Jasper, Texas, classified as a 4A school by the University Interscholastic League.  The school is part of the Jasper Independent School District and serves students in south and central Jasper County.  In  2015, the school was rated "Met Standard" by the Texas Education Agency., Texas|.

Athletics
The Jasper Bulldogs compete in these sports:
Cross country
Volleyball
Football
Basketball
Powerlifting
Soccer
Golf
Tennis
Track
Baseball
Softball

State titles
Baseball - 
2007(3A) Coaches Shawn Mixon, Steve Smith, Joey Brown, David Ford
Girls golf - 
1982(4A)
Boys track - 
1973(3A), 1985(4A), 1991(4A), 1997(4A)
Girls track 
1991(4A)
Boys powerlifting - 
1991, 1992(Div. 1), 1999(Div. 1)
Cheerleading- 2016 UIL 4A state champions

Other extracurricular activities
Jasper High School also has several other activities, including one-act plays, DECA, and FFA.

Notable alumni
 Sam Adams - NFL
 Max Alvis - MLB
 Derick Armstrong - NFL
 Ben Bronson - NFL
 Zack Bronson - NFL
 Red Bryant - NFL
 John Davis - NFL
 James Hadnot - NFL
 Phil Hennigan - MLB
 Eugene Seale - NFL
 Sean Weatherspoon - NFL

References

External links
Jasper ISD

Schools in Jasper County, Texas
Public high schools in Texas